Inherit the Wind is a 1960 American film based on the 1955 play of the same name written by Jerome Lawrence and Robert Edwin Lee. The film was directed by Stanley Kramer. It stars Spencer Tracy as lawyer Henry Drummond and Fredric March as his friend and rival Matthew Harrison Brady. It also features Gene Kelly, Dick York, Harry Morgan, Donna Anderson, Claude Akins, Noah Beery Jr., Florence Eldridge, and Jimmy Boyd.

The script was adapted by Nedrick Young (originally as Nathan E. Douglas) and Harold Jacob Smith. Stanley Kramer was commended for bringing in writer Nedrick Young, as the latter was blacklisted and forced to use the pseudonym Nathan E. Douglas.

Inherit the Wind is a parable that fictionalizes the 1925 Scopes "Monkey" Trial as a means to discuss McCarthyism. Written in response to the chilling effect of the McCarthy era investigations on intellectual discourse, the film (like the play) is critical of creationism.

A television remake of the film which starred Melvyn Douglas and Ed Begley was broadcast in 1965. Another television remake which starred Jason Robards and Kirk Douglas aired in 1988. Once again, it was remade for television in 1999, co-starring Jack Lemmon as Drummond and co-starring George C. Scott as Brady.

Plot
In the small Southern town of Hillsboro, in the 1920s, a schoolteacher, Bertram Cates, is about to stand trial for teaching Darwinism, which is a violation of state law. Cates is denounced by town leaders including Reverend Jeremiah Brown.

The town is excited because Matthew Brady, a noted statesman and three-time presidential candidate, will be assisting in the prosecution of Cates. A staunch foe of evolution and a Biblical scholar, Brady will sit beside prosecuting attorney Tom Davenport, in the courtroom of Judge Coffey.

The teacher's defense is to be handled by the equally well-known Henry Drummond, one of America's most controversial legal minds and a long-standing acquaintance and adversary of Brady. An influential newspaperman, E.K. Hornbeck of the Baltimore Herald, has persuaded Drummond to represent Cates, and ensured that his newspaper and a radio network will provide nationwide coverage of the case.

Rev. Brown publicly rallies the townspeople against Cates and Drummond. The preacher's daughter Rachel is conflicted because she and Cates are engaged. When Rachel cries out against her father's condemnation, Brady admonishes Brown by quoting Proverbs 11:29: "He that troubleth his own house shall inherit the wind."

The courtroom takes on a circus atmosphere with radio broadcasting, newspaper photography and spectator outbursts during the trial. Each time Drummond calls a scientist or authority figure to discuss Darwin's theories, the judge sustains the prosecution's objections and forbids such testimony, ruling that Cates, not evolution, is on trial. Drummond grows frustrated, feeling the case has already been decided. When he asks to withdraw from the case, the judge holds Drummond in contempt of court, orders him jailed, and tells Drummond to show cause the next morning why he should not be held in contempt of court. John Stebbins offers his farm as collateral for Drummond's bail. Stebbins' son was a friend and protégé of Cates who drowned after developing a cramp while swimming. Brown had said the child was damned to hell because he was not baptized. This led to Cates abandoning the church, as he felt it was not fair that a child could not enter Heaven due to an action that was beyond his control.

That night, mocking crowds go by the jail and then to the hotel where Drummond is staying. Drummond is trying to decide how to present his defense without his witnesses and states that he needs a miracle. Hornbeck throws him a Bible from Brady, stating "There are plenty in there." As Hornbeck pours some drinks and turns to Drummond, he is surprised by Drummond holding the Bible and smiling.

Drummond calls Brady himself to the witness stand. Brady's confidence in his Biblical knowledge is so great that he welcomes this challenge, but becomes flustered under Drummond's cross-examination, unable to explain certain Biblical events, until he is forced to confess that at least some Biblical passages cannot be interpreted literally. Drummond hammers home his point — that Cates, like any other man, demands the right to think for himself, and those citing divine support as a rationale to silence him are wrong.

The jury finds Cates guilty, but, the judge, concerned with political embarrassment, fines him only $100 ($ in current dollars). Brady is furious and tries to enter a speech into the record, but Drummond persuades the judge to disallow it as the trial has concluded. As court adjourns, Brady tries to give his speech but most ignore him outside of his wife and his opponents at the defense table — Cates, Rachel, Hornbeck, and Drummond. As he becomes increasingly hysterical, he suffers a "busted belly" and dies.

After the crowd has cleared out, Hornbeck talks with Drummond, wanting to use the Bible quotation from Brown's rally, where Brady had quoted the "inherit the wind" verse because Rev. Brown was about to damn his own daughter to hell. Drummond quotes the verse verbatim, shocking Hornbeck, who states, "Well, we're growing an odd crop of agnostics this year!" They argue over Brady's legacy, Drummond accuses Hornbeck of being a heartless cynic, and Hornbeck walks out, leaving Drummond alone in the courtroom. Drummond picks up the Bible and Darwin's book (On the Origin of Species), balancing them in his hands before walking out with both of them.

Cast

Uncredited roles include Richard Deacon, George Dunn, Snub Pollard, Addison Richards, Harry Tenbrook, Will Wright. Actress and singer Leslie Uggams sings both the opening and closing songs by herself a cappella.

Kramer offered the role of Henry Drummond to Spencer Tracy, who initially turned it down. Kramer then sought March, Kelly, and Eldridge as co-stars, and Tracy eventually agreed to make the film.  However, none of the other co-stars had been signed at the time; Tracy was the first.  Once Tracy signed on, the others signed too.

Production

Background
Inherit the Wind is a fictionalized account of the 1925 Scopes "Monkey" Trial, which took place between July 10 and July 21, 1925, and resulted in John T. Scopes's conviction for teaching Charles Darwin's theory of evolution to a high school science class, contrary to a Tennessee state law. The characters of Matthew Harrison Brady, Henry Drummond, Bertram Cates and E. K. Hornbeck correspond to the historical figures of William Jennings Bryan, Clarence Darrow, Scopes, and H. L. Mencken, respectively. However, Lee and Lawrence state in a note at the opening of the play on which the film is based that it is not meant to be a historical account, and many events were substantially altered or invented. For instance, the characters of the preacher and his daughter were fictional, the townspeople were not hostile towards those who had come to Dayton for the trial, and Bryan offered to pay Scopes' fine if he was convicted. Bryan died shortly after the trial's conclusion, but he died in his sleep five days later, on July 26, 1925, at the age of 65.

Political commentator Steve Benen said the following about the drama's inaccuracies: "Scopes issued no plea for empathy, there was no fiancee and the real Scopes was never arrested.  In a 1996 interview, Lawrence stated that the play's purpose was to criticize McCarthyism and defend intellectual freedom. According to Lawrence, "we used the teaching of evolution as a parable, a metaphor for any kind of mind control ... It's not about science versus religion. It's about the right to think."

Adaptation changes
The film includes events from the actual Scopes trial, such as Darrow's citation for contempt of court when he denounced the court by stating that it was prejudiced and his subsequent act of contrition and his request that the charge be dropped, both events occurred the next day.  The film also expands on the relationship of Drummond and Brady, particularly when the two opponents have a respectful private conversation in rocking chairs, in which they explain their positions in the trial.  Furthermore, the film has a sequence occurring on the night after the court recessed and Cates and Drummond are harassed by a mob even as the lawyer is inspired how to argue his case the next day.

Historical inaccuracies
In the play, Brady is a more extreme Christian fundamentalist than Bryan was. According to historian Ronald Numbers, author of The Creationists, Bryan should be considered a day-age creationist.

Because the judge ruled that scientific evidence was inadmissible, a ruling which the movie depicted, Darrow called Bryan as his only witness and then he attempted to humiliate Bryan by asking him to interpret Scripture. When Darrow, in his closing remarks, called upon the jury to find Scopes guilty so he could appeal the verdict, Bryan was prevented from delivering his summation. The guilty verdict was overturned two years later.  Bryan suffered a heart attack and died in his sleep five days after the trial ended.

Release
The film had its world premiere at the 10th Berlin International Film Festival on June 25, 1960. Its U.S. premiere was in Dayton, Tennessee on July 21, 1960.

Box office
The film grossed $2 million ($ in current dollar terms) worldwide and recorded a loss of $1.7 million ($ in current dollar terms).

Critical reaction

Thomas M. Pryor of Variety described it as "a rousing and fascinating motion picture ... roles of Tracy and March equal Clarence Darrow and William Jennings Bryan who collided on evolution ... a good measure of the film's surface bite is contributed by Gene Kelly as a cynical Baltimore reporter (patterned after Henry L. Mencken) whose paper comes to the aid of the younger teacher played by Dick York. Kelly demonstrates again that even without dancing shoes he knows his way on the screen." Bosley Crowther of The New York Times praised the performances of Tracy and March, and further praised Kramer for displaying "not only a graphic fleshing of his theme but he also has got one of the most brilliant and engrossing displays of acting ever witnessed on the screen." Harrison's Reports praised the cast as "superb", but cautioned that "it will be difficult to sell the average movie-goer unless the limited romantic sequences are exaggerated. It is principally a wordy, philosophical courtroom drama, splendidly produced. Direction is top-notch; photography, excellent..."

In 2006, Roger Ebert of the Chicago Sun-Times rated the film four stars, referring to it as "a film that rebukes the past when it might also have feared the future". On the review aggregator website Rotten Tomatoes, the film has a 93% approval rating, based on 27 reviews with an average rating of 8.1/10.

Awards and nominations

See also

 List of American films of 1960
 Trial movies

References

External links

 
 
 
 

1960 films
1960 drama films
1960s legal films
1960s English-language films
American black-and-white films
American courtroom films
American films based on plays
American legal drama films
Creationism
Cultural depictions of Clarence Darrow
Cultural depictions of John T. Scopes
Films about religion
Films about lawyers
American films based on actual events
Films à clef
Films directed by Stanley Kramer
Films produced by Stanley Kramer
Films scored by Ernest Gold
Films set in 1925
Films set in Tennessee
Films with atheism-related themes
Scopes Trial
United Artists films
1960s American films